Szvetiszláv Sasics (born 19 January 1948) is a Hungarian former modern pentathlete. He competed at the 1976 Summer Olympics winning a bronze medal in the team event.

References

1948 births
Living people
Hungarian male modern pentathletes
Olympic modern pentathletes of Hungary
Modern pentathletes at the 1976 Summer Olympics
Olympic bronze medalists for Hungary
Olympic medalists in modern pentathlon
Medalists at the 1976 Summer Olympics